Trần Trường Giang (born November 1, 1976) is a Vietnamese footballer who is a midfielder for Navibank Sài Gòn. He is a member of the Vietnam national football team from 2002 to 2009.

International career

International goals

Vietnam

Honours
Vietnam
 Third place AFF Championship: 2002

External links 

Vietnamese footballers
Association football midfielders
1976 births
Living people
Navibank Sài Gòn FC players
Vietnam international footballers